Hoenamu-ro, informally called Gyeongnidan-gil, is a street in Itaewon-dong, Yongsan-gu, Seoul, South Korea, as well as the area surrounding the main street. The area is known for its restaurants, bars and cafes.

The name "Gyeongnidan" was derived from the former Republic of Korea Army Financial Management Corps (Yuk-gun-jung-ang-gyeong-ni-dan), which is now the Armed Forces Financial Management Corps.

Early on, it became a residential area for foreigners under the influence of the U.S. troops stationed nearby, and gradually gained popularity by attracting restaurants and bars that suited their preferences. There are now pubs, bars, coffee shops and restaurants lined up.

References

Neighbourhoods of Yongsan District
Multiculturalism in South Korea
Itaewon